Tarjei Bø (born 29 July 1988) is a Norwegian professional biathlete. Awarded Olympic gold medals, World Championship gold medals and World Cup victories from 2010 to 2022. Bø debuted in the Biathlon World Cup on 26 March 2009 in Khanty-Mansiysk, Russia. In the 2010 Winter Olympics, he earned his first gold medal in the 4 × 7.5 km biathlon relay. On 10 December 2010 he won the World Cup sprint race in Hochfilzen, his first world cup victory. He also won the following pursuit race and anchored the winning relay team.
Bø is the older brother of biathlete Johannes Thingnes Bø.

Tarjei won the 2010 to 2011 biathlon crystal globe for having the most points overall in the season. He finished five points ahead of his teammate Emil Hegle Svendsen.

Career

Early career
At his first Junior World Championships in 2006 in Presque Isle, Maine, United States, Bø claimed the gold medal in the individual discipline and the silver medal in the pursuit discipline. A year later in Martell-Val Martello, Italy, Bø again claimed the silver medal in the pursuit discipline and was part of the Norwegian relay team that won the silver medal. The 2009 Junior World Championships in Canmore, Canada began in disappointment: Bø finished as number 23 in the individual discipline with a total of five shooting errors. However, Bø would eventually claim the bronze medal in both the pursuit and sprint disciplines. During the 2009 European Championships in Ufa, Russia, Bø was the most successful biathlete and claimed the gold medal in all four races he entered (individual, sprint, pursuit and relay). At the World Cup finals in Khanty Mansiysk, Russia, Bø made his debut in the Biathlon World Cup on 26 March 2009, finishing 61st.

2009–10 season: Olympic champion

In the 2009–10 season, Bø continued his positive development in the IBU Cup, coming in sixth in the individual discipline and second in the sprint. This led to his appointment to the World Cup races in Pokljuka, Oberhof and Ruhpolding. In Pokljuka, Bø made an impressive performance and finished fourth; in Oberhof, he was part of the Norwegian winning relay team; and in Ruhpolding, he was part of the Norwegian relay team that finished second. On 29 January, Bø was named as one of the 99 athletes that would travel to the 2010 Winter Olympics in Vancouver, Canada. On 18 February, Bø finished 21st in his first Olympics event. Bø was chosen for the Norwegian relay team, which claimed the gold medal before runners-up Austria and bronze-medalists Russia. At the World Cup stop in Kontiolahti, Finland, Bø ran the last leg for the Norwegian mixed team, securing the win for Norway.

2010–11 season: Overall World Cup winner

Bø became a regular fixture in the Norwegian team in the 2010–11 season. He started the season with fourth place in the individual discipline in Östersund, Sweden, followed by fifth and fourth place in the sprint and pursuit disciplines, respectively. On 5 January 2007, Bø won his first World Cup event, the sprint race in Hochfilzen, Austria, beating runner-up Serguei Sednev by 27.5 seconds. One day later, he won his second World Cup victory in the pursuit discipline. On 12 December, he was part of the winning Norwegian relay team. After his highly successful races in Hochfilzen, Bø took the yellow bib of the Overall World Cup leader. In the races in Pokljuka, Bø finished 12th in the individual discipline and second in the sprint. In Oberhof, Bø claimed his third and fourth World Cup victories (mass start and sprint). At the World Cup stops in February in the United States, Bø continued his good form; his worst result was sixth place. He came in fourth in the sprint discipline in Presque Isle, Maine. One week later in Fort Kent, Maine, Bø finished all three races in third place (sprint, pursuit and mass start).

On 3 March, Bø won his first World Championship title as part of the Norwegian mixed team. Running the last lap, Bø secured Norway the victory; this was the first time Norway had won this event. Two days later, Bø came in third in the sprint discipline, behind runner-up Martin Fourcade and Arnd Peiffer. By finishing third, Bø won the Overall Sprint Cup. In the pursuit discipline, Bø again claimed the bronze medal. On 8 March, Bø won his first individual gold medal in the individual, beating runner-up Maxim Maksimov by 40 seconds despite having one shooting error compared to Maksimov's clean shooting. Two days later, Bø claimed his second title alongside Ole Einar Bjørndalen, Alexander Os and Emil Hegle Svendsen in the relay, becoming the most successful biathlete at the championships with a total of five medals.

At the season finals in Oslo, Norway Bø, with five shooting errors, came in 44th in the sprint, his second-worst result this season. In the pursuit two days later, Bø started 2 minutes and 15 seconds behind; however, he pulled back the entire time and eventually finished second, 0.6 seconds behind teammate Emil Hegle Svendsen, thus winning the Overall Pursuit Cup. Bø had a narrow lead of 31 points to Svendsen in the Overall World Cup before the season's last race, mass start. Svendsen won the event, but as Bø finished eight, he beat Svendsen in the Overall Cup by five points, winning the Overall Cup for the first time in his career.

2011–12 season
Bø poorly started the season and finished 25th in the individual in Östersund. He was back on the podium in two of the three next events, however; he finished second in the sprint in Östersund and came in second in the pursuit in Hochfilzen. He was also part of the winning Norwegian relay team in Hochfilzen, running the last lap.

Biathlon results
All results are sourced from the International Biathlon Union.

Olympic Games
6 medals – (3 gold, 2 silver, 1 bronze)

*The mixed relay was added as an event in 2014.

World Championships
22 medals – (11 gold, 3 silver, 8 bronze)

*During Olympic seasons competitions are only held for those events not included in the Olympic program.
**The single mixed relay was added as an event in 2019.

Junior/Youth World Championships
 6 medals – (1 gold, 3 silver, 2 bronze)

World Cup standings
5 titles – (1 overall, 1 individual, 1 sprint, 1 pursuit, 1 mass start)

a.  Until 2009–10 season, IBU did not count an athlete's three worst races in overall World Cup scores. In 2010–11 season, all races were included in World Cup scores. Starting from 2011–12 season, the two worst results have been eliminated again. So the points in the "Points" column is represented after deduction, except 2010–11 season.
b.  Until 2009–10 season it was required to leave out the result of the worst discipline race for the final result of discipline world cup (if there were four discipline races or more during the season), so the points in the "Points" columns for those seasons is represented after deduction of the result of the worst discipline race.

Individual victories
 12 victories – (1 In, 6 Sp, 2 Pu, 3 MS) 
 
* Results are from UIPMB and IBU races which include the Biathlon World Cup, Biathlon World Championships and the Winter Olympic Games.

Relay victories
 34 victories – (25 RL, 9 MR) 

* Results are from UIPMB and IBU races which include the Biathlon World Cup, Biathlon World Championships and the Winter Olympic Games.

Overall record

* Results in all UIPMB and IBU World Cup races, Olympics and World Championships. Statistics as of 5 January 2018.

Shooting

* Results in all IBU World Cup races, Olympics and World Championships including relay events and disqualified races. Statistics as of 19 March 2017.''

References

External links

 
 

1988 births
Living people
People from Stryn
Norwegian male biathletes
Biathletes at the 2010 Winter Olympics
Biathletes at the 2014 Winter Olympics
Biathletes at the 2018 Winter Olympics
Biathletes at the 2022 Winter Olympics
Olympic biathletes of Norway
Medalists at the 2010 Winter Olympics
Medalists at the 2018 Winter Olympics
Medalists at the 2022 Winter Olympics
Olympic medalists in biathlon
Olympic gold medalists for Norway
Olympic silver medalists for Norway
Olympic bronze medalists for Norway
Biathlon World Championships medalists
Holmenkollen Ski Festival winners
Holmenkollen medalists
Sportspeople from Vestland